Empress is a village in southern Alberta, Canada that is adjacent to the provincial boundary between Alberta and Saskatchewan. The village was named, in 1913, for Queen Victoria, who was also Empress of India. In the past it was known as the "Hub of the West", connecting major cities together by the Canadian Pacific Railway.

It is connected to Buffalo Trail by Highway 899 and Highway 562.

Demographics 

The population of the Village of Empress according to its 2017 municipal census is 160.

In the 2016 Census of Population conducted by Statistics Canada, the Village of Empress recorded a population of 135 living in 58 of its 71 total private dwellings, a  change from its 2011 population of 188.

Climate 
Located in the steppe region known as Palliser's Triangle, Empress experiences a semi-arid climate (Köppen climate classification BSk). Winters are long, cold and dry, while summers are short, but with average daytime highs that are warm to hot, though nighttime lows are cool. Spring and autumn are quite short, essentially transition periods between winter and summer. Wide diurnal temperature ranges are regular, due to the aridity and moderately high elevation. Low humidity is prevalent throughout the year. Annual precipitation is very low, with an average of 312mm, and is heavily concentrated in the warmer months.

See also 
Pictures of Buildings in Empress, Alberta
Empress Airport
Empress Canadian Pacific Railway Station
List of communities in Alberta
List of villages in Alberta

References

Further reading

External links 

1914 establishments in Alberta
Borders of Alberta
Borders of Saskatchewan
Special Area No. 2
Villages in Alberta
Populated places established in 1914